The Aroostook River is a  tributary of the Saint John River in the U.S. state of Maine and the Canadian province of New Brunswick. Its basin is the largest sub-drainage of the Saint John River.

The name is derived from the Malecite name Wool-ahs-took, translated by Ganong as "good river for everything".  It appears as Arassatuk (DeRozier, 1699).

History
In the late 1830s, the territory comprising the river's drainage area was the scene of the Aroostook War, a boundary dispute between the United States and the United Kingdom.

Geography
The river rises in northeastern Maine from the confluence of Millinocket Stream and Munsungan Stream in Maine Township 8, Range 8, WELS, in northern Penobscot County. The river winds east and northeast through Aroostook County. It runs through Ashland, and passes north of Presque Isle and east of Caribou. It joins the Saint John River in Aroostook, New Brunswick,  after crossing the Canada–United States border.

The United States government maintains two river flow gages on the Aroostook. Annual maximum flows occur during the spring snow melt and minimums in the fall. The highest flood levels at both gages occurred during ice-dam induced floods, which occur relatively often on this river. Such flooding occurred in March and April 1999, April and May 2003, and April 2004.

The International Appalachian Trail runs along the river for several miles. Hikers cross the river, pass through customs, and cross the international boundary at Fort Fairfield, Maine.

Nature
The river has a small run of Atlantic salmon. From 1998 to 2001, the number of adults returning to the river ranged from seventeen to thirty.

See also
List of rivers of Maine
List of bodies of water of New Brunswick

References

External links

 USGS real-time river flow data at Washburn, Maine or Masardis, Maine.  (Masardis also has air temperature.)
See a panorama of the Aroostook River at Washburn
National Weather Service forecast of river levels and flow.
Real Time Aroostook River WebCam.

Rivers of Aroostook County, Maine
Rivers of New Brunswick
Tributaries of the Saint John River (Bay of Fundy)
International rivers of North America
North Maine Woods